John Fleetwood (1686–1745), of Great Missenden, Buckinghamshire, was an English politician who sat in the House of Commons from 1713 to 1722.

Fleetwood was the eldest surviving son of William Fleetwood of Great Missenden Abbey and his second wife Sarah Bridgwood, daughter of Thomas Bridgwood, citizen and embroiderer of London. He matriculated at Oriel College, Oxford on 23 March 1702 aged 16.

Fleetwood was High Sheriff of Buckinghamshire for the year 1709 to 1710. At the 1713 general election he was returned as Member of Parliament for Buckinghamshire. He was returned unopposed in 1715, but did not stand in 1722.

Fleetwood  married Elizabeth Seare, the daughter of Richard Seare of Great Missenden on 19 January 1724. He died in August 1745. He and his wife had no children and he was succeeded by his sister Mary.

References

1686 births
1745 deaths
People from Great Missenden
Alumni of Oriel College, Oxford
Members of the Parliament of Great Britain for English constituencies
British MPs 1713–1715
British MPs 1715–1722